Shuva also is a Bangladeshi Bengali-language film, released in 2006 all over Bangladesh. It is directed by Chashi Nazrul Islam. The story is based on Rabindranath Tagore's novel Shuvashini. The film was produced and distributed by Impress Telefilm Ltd. It stars Shakib Khan, Purnima, Chashi Nazrul Islam and Sujata. Shakib Khan And Purnima receive the highest accolades for their performance.

Plot
Shuvaa was named as Shuvashini (one who has melodious voice) but she grows as deaf and dumb. Her father married off her two elder sister Suhashini and Sukeshini with grand ceremony. Now its Shuvaa's turn. Shuvaa and Protap from the same village love and understand each other. Protap asked her father to marry her and her father comes to Protap's parents with marriage proposal. Govinda Goswami refuses the proposal and insults him. Being refused and insulted, Banikonto leaves the village with his daughter and wife to his eldest daughter's house to marry off Shuvaa. Soon after her marriage, her husband Nibaron learns Shuvaa's condition that brings misery for her.

Cast
 Shakib Khan as Protap
 Purnima as Shuva
 Saleh Ahmed as Banikantha, Shuva's father
 Sujata as Rashmoni, Shuva's mother 
 Tushar Ahmed Khan as Gobind Goswami, Protap's father
 Shajon as Nibaron, Shuva's husband
 Chashi Nazrul Islam as Kobiraj

Crew
 Producer: Channel I
 Story: Rabindra Nath Tagore (Literature)
 Screenplay: Chashi Nazrul Islam
 Director: Chashi Nazrul Islam

Music
The film's music was directed by Imon Saha.

Soundtrack

Award
 Lux Channeli performance award
 Nominate: Shakib Khan 2006 Critic
 Nominate: Shakib Khan 2006 People choice

References

External links
 

2006 films
2006 drama films
Bengali-language Bangladeshi films
Bangladeshi drama films
Films based on Indian novels
Films based on works by Rabindranath Tagore
Memorials to Rabindranath Tagore
Films scored by Emon Saha
2000s Bengali-language films
Films directed by Chashi Nazrul Islam
Impress Telefilm films